Marquette is a village in Hamilton County, Nebraska, United States. The population was 229 at the 2010 census.

History
Marquette was platted in 1882 when the Burlington and Missouri River Railroad was extended to that point. It was named for Thomas M. Marquette, a railroad official.   Marquette was incorporated as a village in 1889.

Geography
Marquette is located at  (41.006047, -98.009820).

Demographics

2010 census
As of the census of 2010, there were 229 people, 89 households, and 68 families residing in the village. The racial makeup of the village was 99.6% White and 0.4% from two or more races. Hispanic or Latino of any race were 2.6% of the population.

There were 89 households, of which 36.0% had children under the age of 18 living with them, 55.1% were married couples living together, 11.2% had a female householder with no husband present, 10.1% had a male householder with no wife present, and 23.6% were non-families. 18.0% of all households were made up of individuals, and 3.3% had someone living alone who was 65 years of age or older. The average household size was 2.57 and the average family size was 2.93.

The median age in the village was 41.3 years. 28.4% of residents were under the age of 18; 6.1% were between the ages of 18 and 24; 20.1% were from 25 to 44; 32.3% were from 45 to 64; and 13.1% were 65 years of age or older. The gender makeup of the village was 51.5% male and 48.5% female.

2000 census
As of the census of 2000, there were 282 people, 106 households, and 83 families residing in the village. The population density was 1,368.5 people per square mile (518.5/km2). There were 115 housing units at an average density of 558.1 per square mile (211.4/km2). The racial makeup of the village was 98.94% White, 0.71% from other races, and 0.35% from two or more races. Hispanic or Latino of any race were 1.42% of the population.

There were 106 households, out of which 35.8% had children under the age of 18 living with them, 71.7% were married couples living together, 3.8% had a female householder with no husband present, and 20.8% were non-families. 18.9% of all households were made up of individuals, and 2.8% had someone living alone who was 65 years of age or older. The average household size was 2.66 and the average family size was 3.01.

In the village, the population was spread out, with 28.4% under the age of 18, 7.1% from 18 to 24, 28.4% from 25 to 44, 28.4% from 45 to 64, and 7.8% who were 65 years of age or older. The median age was 36 years. For every 100 females, there were 112.0 males. For every 100 females age 18 and over, there were 102.0 males.

As of 2000 the median income for a household in the village was $34,375, and the median income for a family was $36,786. Males had a median income of $26,250 versus $14,792 for females. The per capita income for the village was $16,272. None of the families and 3.5% of the population were living below the poverty line, including none of those under the age of 18 and 16.7% of those 65 and older.

Notable people
Dale Jones, baseball player
J. P. Guilford, psychologist

References

Villages in Hamilton County, Nebraska
Villages in Nebraska